Bill Coffey is a businessman and minor league sports entrepreneur. He is one of the founders of the ECHL (formerly known as the East Coast Hockey League). Founded in 1988, the ECHL is a minor professional ice hockey league that serves as a development league for the NHL. The ECHL iced 20 teams during the 2009–10 season.

Coffey is also the founder of the Atlantic Coast Hockey League (ACHL) - where he served as the league's president; and he is the director of hockey operations for the Southern Professional Hockey League (SPHL). Coffey has been the owner of several minor league ice hockey teams.

Teams owned by Bill Coffey
Fayetteville Force (CHL)
Knoxville Cherokees (ECHL)
St. Petersburg Parrots (ACHL)
Tallahassee Tide (ACHL)
Greensboro Monarchs (ECHL)
Winston-Salem Thunderbirds (ECHL)

References

American sports businesspeople
ECHL
Living people
Year of birth missing (living people)